"Goodnight Goodnight" is a song by Canadian indie rock band Hot Hot Heat and is from their second album, Elevator. The song was released in the UK and US as the first single from Elevator on May 16, 2005. It reached number 36 in the UK Singles Chart. and number 27 on the Modern Rock Tracks chart in the U.S.

Chart performance

References

2005 singles
Hot Hot Heat songs
2004 songs
Songs written by Dante DeCaro
Songs written by Steve Bays